Pat or PAT may refer to:

Science and technology
 Photographic Activity Test, an ISO standard test
 Portable appliance testing, an electrical safety test
 Powder-actuated tool, a type of nail gun

Computing
 PAT (model checker) (Process Analysis Toolkit)
 Page attribute table, in x86 and x86-64 memory caching
 Performance acceleration technology, an Intel memory performance technology
 Port address translation, a type of network address translation
 Program Association Table, in an MPEG transport stream
 Personal access token, a password alternative

Medicine and biology
 Paddington alcohol test, for alcohol-related problems
 Paroxysmal atrial tachycardia, an episode of arrhythmia that begins and ends abruptly
 Peripheral Arterial Tone, a noninvasive measure

 Phosphinothricin acetyltransferase, an enzyme
 Photoacoustic tomography, by an ultrasound scan
 Picture arrangement test
 Process analytical technology, in pharmaceutical manufacturing
 Pseudotropine acyltransferase, an enzyme
 Putrescine aminotransferase, an enzyme

Places
 Pat, Hungary, a village
 Patince, a village in Slovakia
 Pat, Iran, a village in Iran
 Pat, Jerusalem, a neighborhood in Israel
 Pat River, Thailand
 Port Arthur, Texas, US

People
 Patricia, a female given name
 Patrick (given name), a male given name
 Narcisse Théophile Patouillard (1854–1926) (standard botanical abbreviation "Pat."), French pharmacist and mycologist
 Jenny Pat (1981–2014), Hong Kong-born, Chinese-Canadian international art dealer, visual artist, and television personality

Arts, entertainment and media
 P.A.T. Network, a Bolivian TV channel operated by the company Periodistas Asociados de Televisión; See Justa Canaviri

Fictional characters
 Pat (Alice's Adventures in Wonderland), a gardener
 Pat (Saturday Night Live), an androgynous character
 Postman Pat, a British children's TV character
 Pat, from the Czech series Pat & Mat
 Pat the Dog, a character from the show

Organisations
 Pakistan Awami Tehrik, a political party
 Polish Telegraphic Agency, the official news agency of Poland between 1918 and 1991
 Port Authority of Thailand
 Professional Association of Teachers, the former name of the UK trade union Voice

Transportation
 Jay Prakash Narayan Airport (IATA airport code), Patna, India
 Patricroft railway station (National Rail station code), England
 Port Authority Transit, former name of the Port Authority of Allegheny County, Pennsylvania, US

Other uses
 Pat, a form of physical intimacy
 Pat silk, a type of silk
 Point after touchdown, in American football
 Prodotto agroalimentare tradizionale, an Italian grade of Protected Geographical Status
 Profit After Tax
 Pat hand, in the card game of poker

See also
 Ex-pat, a person residing in a country other than their native country
 I = PAT, in environmental impact
 Patricia (disambiguation)
 Patrick (disambiguation)
 PATS (disambiguation)

da:Pat
fr:Pat
hu:Pat (egyértelműsítő lap)
nl:Pat
ja:パット
no:Pat
pt:Pat